Podgrad is a village southwest of Ilirska Bistrica in the Inner Carniola region of Slovenia, close to the border with Croatia.

Unmarked grave
Podgrad is the site of an unmarked grave from the end of the Second World War. The Cemetery Grave is located in the village cemetery and contains the remains of a German soldier from the 97th Corps that fell at the beginning of May 1945. Its exact location is unknown.

Churches
The parish church in the settlement is dedicated to Saints Cyril and Methodius and belongs to the Koper Diocese. There is a second church in the settlement dedicated to Saint James.

Notable people
Notable people that were born or lived in Podgrad include:
Radovan Gobec (1909–1995), composer

References

External links

Podgrad on Geopedia
Podgrad Local Community site

Populated places in the Municipality of Ilirska Bistrica